Anthony Burgess: A Life is the title of a biography of the novelist and critic Anthony Burgess (1917–93) by Roger Lewis.

Blake Morrison, in his review in The Guardian, describes the book as "an idle, fatuous, self-regarding book".

Notes

2002 non-fiction books
Biographies about writers
Anthony Burgess